Julianne Marie Malveaux (born September 22, 1953) is an American economist, author, social and political commentator, and businesswoman. After five years as the 15th president of Bennett College in Greensboro, North Carolina, she resigned on May 6, 2012.

Education and career

Raised Catholic, Malveaux entered Boston College after the 11th grade, and earned a BA and MA degrees in economics there in three years. During her stay, she was initiated in the Iota chapter of Delta Sigma Theta sorority. She earned a PhD in economics from MIT, and holds honorary degrees from Benedict College, Sojourner-Douglass College and the University of the District of Columbia.

As a writer and syndicated columnist, her work has appeared regularly in USA Today, Black Issues in Higher Education, Ms. magazine, Essence magazine, and The Progressive. Her weekly columns appear in numerous newspapers including the Los Angeles Times, the Charlotte Observer, the New Orleans Tribune, the Detroit Free Press, the San Francisco Examiner and the San Francisco Sun Reporter.

Malveaux appeared regularly on CNN, BET, as well as on Howard University's television show, Evening Exchange. She has appeared on PBS's To The Contrary, KQED's Forum, ABC’s Politically Incorrect, Fox News Channel's The O'Reilly Factor, TV One's News One Now, with Roland Martin and stations such as C-SPAN, MSNBC and CNBC.

She hosted talk radio programs in Washington, San Francisco, and New York, as well as a nationally broadcast, daily talk show that aired on the Pacifica Radio network from 1995 to 1996. She appeared on Black in America: Reclaiming the Dream hosted by Soledad O'Brien as a panelist on CNN in 2008.

Currently, Malveaux serves on the boards of the Economic Policy Institute as well as The Black Doctoral Network and she is President of PUSH Excel, the educational branch of the Rainbow PUSH Coalition. She is also the President and founder, of Economic Education a non-profit located in Washington, DC. Described by Cornel West as "the most iconoclastic public intellectual in the country", Malveaux contributes to the public dialogue on issues such as race, culture, gender, and their economic impacts.

In 1990, Malveaux, along with 15 other African American women and men, formed the African-American Women for Reproductive Freedom.

She taught at San Francisco State University (1981–1985) and was a visiting professor at the University of California, Berkeley, (1985–1992). She has been visiting faculty at the New School for Social Research, College of Notre Dame (San Mateo, California), Michigan State University, and Howard University. In 2014, she was special guest lecturer at both Meharry Medical College, (Nashville, Tennessee) and in 2017 she delivered a three-part lecture as part of Hutchins Center for African and African American Research, Harvard University's W.E.B. Dubois lecture series.

On June 1, 2007, Malveaux became the 15th President of Bennett College for Women in Greensboro, North Carolina. In February 2012, Malveaux announced that she would be stepping down from this position in May 2012, saying in a statement: "While I remain committed to [historically black colleges and universities] and the compelling cause of access in higher education, I will actualize that commitment, now, in other arenas. I will miss Bennett College and will remain one of its most passionate advocates."

Malveaux was appointed dean of the new college of Ethnic Studies at California State University, Los Angeles.

Scholarship
Editor
Voices of Vision: African American Women on the Issues (1996)

Co-editor
Slipping Through the Cracks: The Status of Black Women (1986)
The Paradox of Loyalty: An African American Response to the War on Terrorism (2002).

Author

Sex, Lies, and Stereotypes: Perspectives of a Mad Economist (1994)
Wall Street, Main Street, and the Side Street: A Mad Economist Takes a Stroll (1999)
Surviving and Thriving: 365 facts in Black Economic History (2010)
Are We Better Off? Race, Obama and Public Policy (2016)

Co-author
Unfinished Business: A Democrat and A Republican Take On the 10 Most Important Issues Women Face (2002).

References

External links

In Depth interview with Malveaux, August 1, 2012
Interview, “Evening Exchange; Health / Finances / Prince Georges Council Term Limits,” 2000-08-28, WHUT, American Archive of Public Broadcasting (WGBH and the Library of Congress)

1953 births
African-American economists
Economists from California
American women journalists
American radio personalities
Heads of universities and colleges in the United States
Bennett College faculty
American women economists
Living people
Pacifica Foundation people
MIT School of Humanities, Arts, and Social Sciences alumni
Morrissey College of Arts & Sciences alumni
San Francisco State University faculty
University of California, Berkeley faculty
Writers from San Francisco
21st-century American economists
Women heads of universities and colleges
21st-century African-American people
21st-century African-American women
20th-century African-American people
20th-century African-American women